Kapan may refer to:

 Kapan, Armenia, a town
 Kapan Airport
 Kapan Futsal, a professional futsal club
 Kapan mine, a gold mine
 Kapan Municipality
 Kingdom of Syunik, sometimes called the Kingdom of Kapan
 Kapan, Nepal, a village
 Kapan Han, a han in the Old Bazaar of Skopje, North Macedonia

See also
 Qapan (disambiguation), places in Iran